End Times is the eighth studio album by American rock band Eels released on January 19, 2010. End Times is the second in a trilogy of concept albums starting with 2009's Hombre Lobo and finishing with Tomorrow Morning, released later in 2010.

Content 
The album was self-produced by frontman Mark Oliver Everett and focuses on themes of divorce and aging. The cover was designed by Adrian Tomine.

Release 
End Times was released on January 19, 2010. The album was also released in a deluxe edition with a bonus EP.

The music video for "Little Bird" was released on YouTube through the official Eels channel in November 2009 and "In My Younger Days" in December 2009. The single for "A Line in the Dirt" backed with "Little Bird" was released through Eels' online store on January 13, 2010.

Reception 

Critical response to the album has been mostly positive. Will Dean of The Guardian called it "a classic break-up album".

Pitchfork published a negative review of the album, calling it "by all accounts a break-up album, but one that's plodding, boring, and full of icky self-pity [...] Eventually, Everett's disassociation with himself results in a disassociation with the music, as each painfully plain entry becomes simply exhaustively dull."

Track listing
All songs written by E.
"The Beginning" – 2:16
"Gone Man" – 2:59
"In My Younger Days" – 3:25
"Mansions of Los Feliz" – 2:49
"A Line in the Dirt" – 3:30
"End Times" – 2:58
"Apple Trees" – 0:40
"Paradise Blues" – 3:03
"Nowadays" – 3:09
"Unhinged" – 2:26
"High and Lonesome" – 1:07
"I Need a Mother" – 2:39
"Little Bird" – 2:34
"On My Feet" – 6:21

Deluxe edition bonus EP
"And Now for the End Times" – 0:19
"Some Friend" – 2:42
"Walking Cloud" – 2:25
"$200 Tattoo" – 2:02
"The Man Who Didn't Know He'd Lost His Mind" – 2:36

The short spoken-word introduction is only available on the iTunes Store edition of the album.

Personnel
Eels
E – vocals, guitars, bass guitar, harmonica, piano, Optigan, Hammond B3, banjo, pump organ, Vox Continental, drums, percussion, production
Butch – drums on "A Line in the Dirt"
Koool G Murder – bass, guitar, recording, mixing on "Paradise Blues" and "Nowadays"
Wayne Bergeron – French horn, horns
Chris Bleth – horns
Andy Martin – horns

Technical personnel
Ryan Boesch – recording and mixing on "Apple Trees", "Gone Man", and "In My Younger Days"
Robert Carranza – recording, mixing on "A Line in the Dirt"
Greg Collins – recording and mixing on "Apple Trees"
Jim Lang – recording and horn arrangements on "A Line in the Dirt" and "Nowadays"

Charts

Weekly charts

Year-end charts

References

2010 albums
Concept albums
Eels (band) albums
Vagrant Records albums
Albums produced by Mark Oliver Everett